Christopher "Ping" Exciminiano (born November 17, 1988) is a Filipino professional basketball player for the TNT Tropang Giga of the Philippine Basketball Association (PBA).

Early life
Exciminiano was born in Olongapo City to William Veins Green, a US Navy Serviceman who was once stationed in Subic, and Gina Exciminiano. His father abandoned them even before he was born. He has since not seen or met his dad until now but hopes to finally meeting him one day.

College career
Exciminiano played collegiate basketball at FEU where he established himself as defensive stopper, while serving as backup to Terrence Romeo and RR Garcia. He also suited up for the Cagayan Rising Suns in the PBA Developmental League.

Professional career
Exciminiano was selected 18th overall in the 2013 PBA draft by the Aces.

During his rookie season, he struggled to get some playing time as a third-string shooting guard to Cyrus Baguio and Dondon Hontiveros and was shuffled in an out of Alaska's active roster. However, in his sophomore season, he became one of coach Alex Compton's reliable energy guys off the bench as Alaska veered away from the triangle offense and adopted the fast-paced, full court-pressing system.

He was the unsung hero of the Aces' come-from-behind victory in the pivotal Game Five against Rain or Shine in their semi-final series, and would reprise the same role in another come-from-behind win in Game Three against San Miguel in the 2014–15 PBA Philippine Cup Finals.

In his third season, he continued to play significant minutes for the Aces, often assigned as the defensive stopper for the opposing scorers. He typified his role during the 2015–16 PBA Philippine Cup semifinals against GlobalPort when he was assigned to defend Terrence Romeo.  His defensive stops were keys to winning the series.

On October 14, 2016, Exciminiano was recognized during the PBA Leo Awards Night as he was named to the PBA All-Defensive Team.

On August 16, 2019, Exciminiano, along with 2019 first round pick, was traded to Rain or Shine Elasto Painters for Maverick Ahanmisi.

In February 2021, Exciminiano was signed by the TNT Tropang Giga to a one-year deal. A month later, with the blessing of TNT, he was signed up by the KCS Computer Specialist–Mandaue to play in the Visayas leg of the first season of the Pilipinas VisMin Super Cup.

PBA career statistics

As of the end of 2021 season

Season-by-season averages

|-
| align=left | 
| align=left | Alaska
| 11 || 9.6 || .417 || .368 || .500 || .6 || .2 || .6 || .1 || 3.6
|-
| align=left | 
| align=left | Alaska
| 57 || 13.1 || .521 || .125 || .488 || 1.3 || .7 || .8 || .1 || 3.4
|-
| align=left | 
| align=left | Alaska
| 57 || 11.5 || .433 || .344 || .621 || 1.7 || 1.0 || .7 || .0 || 3.5
|-
| align=left | 
| align=left | Alaska
| 33 || 16.5 || .405 || .264 || .621 || 1.8 || 1.3 || 1.1 || .2 || 4.6
|-
| align=left | 
| align=left | Alaska
| 50 || 14.8 || .399 || .241 || .546 || 2.1 || 1.1 || .8 || .1 || 3.4
|-
| align=left rowspan=2| 
| align=left | Alaska
| rowspan=2|33 || rowspan=2|12.6 || rowspan=2|.345 || rowspan=2|.200 || rowspan=2|.500 || rowspan=2|2.0 || rowspan=2|.7 || rowspan=2|.8 || rowspan=2|.2 || rowspan=2|3.9
|-
| align=left | Rain or Shine
|-
| align=left | 
| align=left | TNT
| 19 || 3.4 || .350 || .250 || .500 || .4 || .2 || .2 || .1 || 1.0
|-class=sortbottom
| align=center colspan=2 | Career
| 260 || 12.6 || .421 || .252 || .546 || 1.6 || .8 || .8 || .1 || 3.5

References

1988 births
Living people
Alaska Aces (PBA) draft picks
Alaska Aces (PBA) players
Basketball players from Zambales
FEU Tamaraws basketball players
Filipino men's basketball players
Filipino people of African-American descent
Point guards
Rain or Shine Elasto Painters players
Shooting guards
Sportspeople from Olongapo
TNT Tropang Giga players
Filipino men's 3x3 basketball players
PBA 3x3 players